The Castello di Lombardia ("Lombardy Castle") is a castle in Enna, Sicily. It is one of the largest and most ancient edifices in Italy, with an area of some

History
The castle's origins are related to a fortress erected in the 1st millennium BC by the Sicani on the foundation of the ancient Henna, on a hill 970 m above sea level. It remained a key possession in the subsequent history of the island, and the Romans were able to conquer it only by passing through its sewer network.

Under the castle was the ancient Sican temple of Ceres, site of the widespread cult of that goddess in the whole of Italy, which was described by Cicero.

After the fall of the Western Roman Empire, it was used by the Byzantines and resisted Arab assaults for many years. After their victory, the latter rebuilt the fortress around the 10th century; the castle was also used by their successors in Sicily, the Normans. Two centuries later, architect Richard of Lentini was commissioned by Frederick II, Emperor and King of Sicily, to restore it as a summer residence. He added 20 towers and called in a garrison coming from the Langobardia minor (Calabria), whence the castle's name.

With the advent of the artillery, the castle lost its primary strategic role and was turned into a prison. In the 20th and early 21st century, the castle was the site of the Teatro più vicino alle Stelle ("The Nearest Theatre to the Stars"), used for opera and pop music concerts. The castle is now open to the public.

See also

List of castles in Italy

Buildings and structures completed in the 11th century
Houses completed in the 13th century
Lombardia
Lombardia
Enna